Salem High School is one of three public secondary schools in the Rockdale County School District in Conyers, Georgia, United States. The school educates about 1,600 students in grades 9 to 12 in the Rockdale County Public School district.

Information 
Salem High School is located in Conyers, in East Metro Atlanta. First led by Robert Creswell, it was established in 1991 as the third high school in Rockdale County, coming to be known as the Seminoles. Approximately 1600 students are enrolled.

The school was named a State School of Excellence in 1999 and in 2007, and a National School of Excellence in 2000.

In the Taylor's Publishing Yearbook for 2007, the staff received the Honorable Mention recognition award for their annual, themed "Making Connections."

Athletics 
Salem is a part of the GHSA in Region 5-AAA. The school has teams for football, softball, competition cheerleading, swim team, women's and men's basketball, baseball, women's and men's soccer, golf, tennis, track and field, and cross country.

In 2004 the football Seminoles played an undefeated season and went to the Georgia Dome, in their greatest playoff berth, but lost to Statesboro High School, leaving them in a 13-1 season. In 2005, they once again won the region championship, but lost in the 2nd round playoff to Marist High School, 35-14.

Torrell Troup, a 2006 graduate, was drafted in the second round of the 2010 NFL Draft by the Buffalo Bills.

Notable alumni 
 Akil Baddoo, MLB outfielder
 Billy Buckner, MLB pitcher
 Da'shawn Thomas, CFL player
 Torrell Troup, NFL player
 Teddy Swims, Musical Artist

References

External links 
 Salem High School

Educational institutions established in 1991
Public high schools in Georgia (U.S. state)
Schools in Rockdale County, Georgia
1991 establishments in Georgia (U.S. state)